Feylis, also known as Feyli Kurds, is a Kurdish tribe mainly from Baghdad and the borderlands between Iraq and Iran.They speak Feyli (also known as "Ilami" or "Southern Kurdish Feyli") which is classified as a sub-dialect of Southern Kurdish, but is commonly mistaken as being identical with the separate Feyli dialect of Northern Luri. Linguist Ismaïl Kamandâr Fattah argues that the Kurdish Feyli dialect and other Southern Kurdish sub-dialects are 'interrelated and largely mutually intelligible.'

Feylis are recognized as ethnic Kurds in the Iraqi constitution. In January 2019, Feyli Kurds received a reserved minority seat in Wasit Governorate, which was won by Mazen Abdel Moneim Gomaa with 5,078 votes in the 2018 Iraqi parliamentary election.

Today, the 1,500,000 Feylis live mainly in Baghdad, Maysan, Diyala, Wasit, Sulaymaniyah, in Iraq, and provinces of Lorestan, Ilam, Kermanshah in Iran.

History 
Austen Henry Layard (1887) described Feylis as the largest and the most powerful of Lur tribes inhabiting the mountains to the north of Dezful.

In 1953, British historian Stephen Hemsley Longrigg wrote about the political history of Iraq and wrote:

and furthermore:

Iraq 

Feylis predominately live in Baghdad, Kut, Khanaqin, Mandali, Badra near the Iranian border and consider themselves ethnic Kurds. Feylis of Iraq have taken actively part in the Kurdish fight for independence and  many Feylis have risen to position of great power, including Fuad Hussein of Kurdistan Democratic Party. Feylis have been involved in the Kurdistan Democratic Party since its founding in 1946 and were also actively involved in the Patriotic Union of Kurdistan since its establishment in 1975. In addition, Feylis have had notable contributions to the Iraqi culture, including the acclaimed oud player, Naseer Shamma.

In the mid-1970s, Iraq expelled around 40,000 Feylis who had lived for generations near Baghdad and Khanaqin, alleging that they were Iranian nationals. From 1971 to 1980, more than 200,000 Feyli Kurds were banished from their homeland by the Iraqi government. In 1980 Saddam Hussein offered 10`000 ID (ca. US$30`000) for Iraqi citizens who divorced their Faylee Kurds, who afterwards were deported to Iran. In 2010, the Iraqi Ministry of Displacement and Migration reported that since 2003 about 100,000 Feylis have had their citizenship reinstated.

On Monday 29 November 2010, an Iraqi court found Saddam Hussein's longtime foreign minister Tariq Aziz guilty of terrorizing Feylis during the Iran–Iraq War (see Kurdish rebellion of 1983 and Al-Anfal Campaign), sentencing him to 10 years in prison. Mohammed Abdul Saheb, a spokesman for Iraq's high criminal court, said: "Today a judge found Tariq Aziz guilty and sentenced him to 10 years in prison. The evidence was enough to convict him of displacing and killing Feyli Kurds. Aziz was a member of the revolutionary command council which cancelled the Iraqi nationality for many of the Feyli Kurds." The spokesman also said Aziz was spared a death sentence for the crimes against humanity because he had a lesser involvement than some of his co-defendants in the atrocities against the Feyli Kurds. Of the other 15 defendants in the Iraqi High Tribunal case, three Saddam Hussein loyalists were found guilty and sentenced to death. Two, including Aziz, were sentenced to 10 years in prison. The remaining 10 were acquitted, including Hussein's two half brothers, Watban Ibrahim al-Hassan and Sabbawi Ibrahim al-Hassan. The Feyli Kurd minority comes mainly from an area in northeastern Iraq that straddles the Iran–Iraq border. Saddam Hussein's regime killed, detained and deported tens of thousands of Feylis early in his 1980–1988 war with Iran, denouncing them as alien Persians and spies for the Iranians.

In October 2011, the National Conference for Feyli Kurds held a conference in the Iraqi capital Baghdad which was attended by the Iraqi Prime Minister Nouri al-Maliki. Al-Maliki said in a speech "the Feyli Kurds have been targets for harming, similar to other Iraqi communities". He also called "for the unity of Feyli Kurds under a common tent, uniting them and organizing their activities, together with other Iraqi communities". He ended his speech by saying "we shall support the rights of the Feyli Kurds, beginning with the restoration of their official documents and their presence in their homeland and ending with the paying back the funds that were confiscated from them (during the former regime)". The Iraqi Prime Minister also recognized "that over 22,000 Feyli Kurds had been deported from Iraq by the former regime, calling for the restoration of their rights".

Iran 
Feylis in Iran live predominantly in Ilam Province and parts of Lorestan, and have from the beginning of the 19th century moved westwards. Their connection to the trade routes between Iran and Iraq made them play an important role in Baghdad's commerce. Furthermore, the Exodus of Iran's Jews in 1948 to Israel which included Jewish merchants allowed Feylis to fill the economic gap.

See also 
Kurdish tribes
Khulam Rada Khan Arkawazi

References 

Diyala Governorate
Ilam Province
Kermanshah Province
Lorestan Province
Kurdish tribes
Shia communities
War crimes in Iraq
Iranian Kurdistan
Iraqi Kurdistan